is a high school for girls in Okazaki, Aichi, Japan.

It was established in 1963.

Campus
It includes a dormitory built in 1969, a convent built in 1972 that has an attached chapel, and a gymnasium built in 1965.

References

External links
 Hikarigaoka Girls' High School 
  (English)
  (English and Japanese)

Girls' schools in Japan
High schools in Aichi Prefecture
Schools in Aichi Prefecture
1963 establishments in Japan
Educational institutions established in 1963
Okazaki, Aichi